Lin Wenzheng (c. 19021989) was a Chinese painter.

Early life and career
Lin spent some seven years studying Western painting in Paris, France; in 1924, he founded the Society of Overseas Artists in Paris together with fellow artists Lin Fengmian, Liu Jipiao, and others. Returning to China, Lin taught art at various schools and was for some time provost at the Hangzhou-based China Academy of Art, where his wife Cai Weilian (19041939) also taught. In World War II, Lin and his family moved to Kunming, Yunnan, where he worked with the Southwest United Universities. Lin and his wife had six children; Cai Weilian died two days after giving birth to their sixth child in 1939. Having to juggle multiple jobs to make ends meet, Lin found life as a widower almost unbearable but found solace in poetry and Buddhism.

Later years and death
Following the Chinese Civil War, Lin relocated to Nanjing and lectured on foreign literature at the Nanjing University. In 1954, he married Lian Dizhen, a proofreader at the Nanjing University Press who was about twenty years his junior. Lin Wenzheng was sentenced to twenty years of imprisonment in November 1957 for allegedly propagating right-wing sentiments, leaving his second wife Lian in charge of the household. During the Cultural Revolution, Lian was identified by the government as a potential counter-revolutionary, tortured, and ultimately coerced into divorcing Lin; she died two years later. In 1975, while still in prison, Lin was commissioned to translate A Brief History of Chinese Fiction by Lu Xun from Chinese to French. Lin was released a year later; he spent his final years in Hangzhou, under his youngest daughter Zhengming's care, and died in 1989 aged 87.

References

1900s births
1989 deaths
Artists from Hangzhou
Chinese–French translators
Academic staff of Nanjing University
20th-century Chinese translators